The following is a discography of production by Don Cannon.

Production credits

2005

Young Jeezy - Let's Get It: Thug Motivation 101 
 6. "Go Crazy" (featuring Jay-Z)

2006

Young Jeezy - The Inspiration 
 14. "Mr. 17.5"

Claudette Ortiz - Non-album release 
 00. "Can't Get Enough" (featuring Mase)

Lil Scrappy - Bred 2 Die Born 2 Live 
 12. "Get Right" (featuring Yo Gotti)

Cassidy - Best Of The Hustla 
 00. "It Is What It Is" (Produced with Swizz Beatz)

2007

DJ Drama - Gangsta Grillz: The Album 
 5. "Cannon Remix" (featuring Lil Wayne, Freeway, T.I, and Willie The Kid) 
 8. "The Art of Storytellin' Part 4" (featuring Outkast, and Marsha Ambrosius)
 14. "No More" (featuring T.I, and Lloyd)
 16. "Throw Ya Sets Up" (featuring Yung Joc, Jadakiss, and Willie The Kid)

Freeway - Free At Last 
 12. "Walk Wit Me" (featuring Busta Rhymes, and Jadakiss)

Fabolous - From Nothin' to Somethin' 
 13. "Joke's On You" (featuring Pusha T)

50 Cent - Curtis 
 3. "Man Down"

2008

G-Unit - T.O.S.: Terminate on Sight 
 12. "Let It Go" (featuring Mavado)

Young Jeezy - The Recession 
 10. "Circulate"

Ludacris - Theater of the Mind 
 2. "Undisputed" (featuring Floyd Mayweather Jr.)
 7. "Everybody Hates Chris" (featuring Chris Rock)

Dj Greg Street - Certified Worldwide 
 00. "Dope Boys (Remix)" (featuring Lupe Fiasco, Wale and Kardinall Official)

Asher Roth - Asleep in the Bread Aisle 
 4. "La Di Da"

2010

Macy Gray - The Sellout 
 11. "On & On" (Produced with Hit-Boy)

Sheek Louch - Donnie G: Don Gorilla 
 4. "Out The Ghetto"

CJ Hilton - Non-album release 
 00. "We Can Get It In" (Produced with Mars Of 1500 or Nothin')

2011

The Game - The R.E.D. Album 
 14. "All The Way Gone" (featuring Wale and Mario) (Produced with Mars Of 1500 or Nothin')

Estelle - All Of Me 
 7. "Break My Heart" (featuring Rick Ross) (Produced with Mars Of 1500 or Nothin')

2012

Maybach Music Group - Self Made 2 
 3. "This Thing Of Ours" (featuring Nas)

2 Chainz - Based on a T.R.U. Story 
 16. "I Feel Good"

2013

Pusha T - My Name Is My Name 
 2. "Numbers On the Board" (Produced with Kanye West, and 88 Keys)

Logic - Young Sinatra: Welcome to Forever 
 11. "Nasty"

2014

Young Jeezy - Seen It All 
 5. "Holy Ghost" (Produced with Lyle Leduff)

2015

Lil Uzi Vert - Luv Is Rage 
 1. "Safe House" (Produced with Maaly Raw)
 7. "Top"
 12. "Paradise"

WE55 - The Black Prince Charles 
 10. "Crazy"

2016

Lil Uzi Vert - Lil Uzi Vert Vs. The World 
 3. "Money Longer" (Produced with Maaly Raw)
 4. "Grab The Wheel"
 7. "Ps And Qs"
 8. "Team Rocket" (Produced with Lyle Leduff)

Lil Uzi Vert - The Perfect LUV Tape 
 1. "Do What I Want" (Produced with Maaly Raw)
 7. "You're Lost" (Produced with Slade Da Monsta)
 8. "Erase Your Social" (Produced with Lyle Leduff)
 10. "Seven Million" (Produced with Nard & B)

Mod Sun - Non-album release 
 00. "Smoking' What I'm Smokin' On" (featuring Rich the Kid and D.R.A.M)

Lyquin - The Other Side 
 2. "Confianza"

2017

Nick Grant - Return of the Cool 
 4. "All of You" (featuring B. Hess)
 9. "Get Down (Poonana)"

Wale - Shine 
 6. "Colombia Heights (Te Llamo)" featuring J Balvin

DJ Drama - Shine 
 2. "Big Money (C4 Remix)" featuring Rich Homie Quan, Lil Uzi Vert and Skeme (Produced with C4) 
 4. "Audible" featuring WDNG Crshrs

Lil Uzi Vert - Luv Is Rage 2 
 1. "Two®" (Produced with Lil Uzi Vert and LeDuff)
 3. "Sauce It Up" (Produced with Michael Piroli and BeldonDidThat)
 4. "No Sleep Leak" (Produced with Cubeatz)
 5. "The Way Life Goes" featuring Oh Wonder (Produced with Ike Beatz)
 10. "UnFazed" featuring The Weeknd (Produced with DaHeala, The Weeknd, and Maaly Raw)
 11. "Pretty Mami" (Produced with Illmind)

Lil Uzi Vert - Non-album release 
 00. "The Way Life Goes Remix" featuring Oh Wonder, and Nicki Minaj (Produced with Ike Beatz)

2018

Problem - S2 
 15. "Multiply" (featuring Mozzy and YBN Cordae) (Produced with JB minor and Cypress Merona)

Meek Mill - Championships 
 2. "Trauma"

Future and Juice Wrld - Wrld on Drugs 
 12. "WRLD On Drugs" (Produced with Oogie Mane and B Hunna)

Offset - Father of 4 
 12. "After Dark" (Produced with Metro Boomin , Allen Ritter and Dre Moon)

G Herbo - Humble Beast 
 2. "Black" (Produced with Maaly Raw and DP Beats) 
 3. "Bi Polar" (Produced with Watson The Great)

Killumantii - Yellow Tape 
 2. "Kill Em" (Produced with Oz Betaz) 
 5. "Envious" (featuring Juicy J)(Produced with Kill Beats)

Playboi Carti - Die Lit 
 15. "No time" (featuring Gunna)

2019

The Game - Born 2 Rap 
 10. "Gucci Flip Flops" (Produced with Swizz Beatz)

Jack Harlow - Confetti 
 3. "Ice" (Produced with 2Fowoyne)
 7. "Goin Back Down" (Produced with 2Fowoyne)

Young Dolph - Role Model 
 8. "On God" (Produced with Rickie Lamar Thomas)

Seddy Hendrinx - Roots II 
 8. "Low Key"

2020

Lil Uzi Vert - Lil Uzi Vert vs. the World 2 
 2. "Lotus" (Produced with Oogie Mane and Treshaun Beats)

Tory Lanez - The New Toronto 3 
 5. "Dope Boy Diary" (Produced with Oogie Mane and Sean Momberger)

G Herbo - PTSD 
 1. "Intro" (Produced with Dopson)

G Herbo - PTSD 
 5. "Party In Heaven"(featuring Lil Durk) (Produced with Lyle LeDuff and Sean Momberger)

G Herbo - PTSD Deluxe Edition 
 5. "In A Minute" (Produced with Sean Momberger)

G Herbo - PTSD Deluxe Edition 
 11. "Trenches" (Produced with Sean Momberger)

Seddy Hendrinx - B.H.D. (Black Hearted Demon) 
 1. "Emotional Pt 2" 
 3. "Hands Down"

Black Soprano Family - Benny the Butcher & DJ Drama Present: The Respected Sopranos 
 8. "Its Over" featuring Benny the Butcher, Heems & Rick Hyde

Wiz Khalifa - The Saga of Wiz Khalifa (Deluxe) 
 3. "On Top" 
 5. "This Time Around"

Rapsody - Non-album release 
 00. "12 Problems"

Jeezy - The Recession 2 
 2. "Here We Go" (Produced with Sean Momberger)
 3. "Modern Day" 
 4. "Back" (Produced with Cubeatz)

Symba - Don't Run From R.A.P. 
 11. "Westside Story"

24hrs and DJ Drama - 12 AM in Atlanta 2 
 9. "Love Atlanta" featuring Nessly

2021

Fedd The God - Non-album release 
 00. "42"

Conway The Machine - La Maquina 
 4. "Clarity"
 9. "Scatter Brain" featuring Ludacris and JID

Big Sean - What You Expect 
 4. "Loyal To A Fault" featuring Bryson Tiller and Lil Durk

Childish Major - Thank You, God. For it all. 
 4. "Down South"

G Herbo - 25 
 8. "Whole Hearts"

Rick Ross - Richer Than I Ever Been 
 6. "Wiggle"

2022

Lecrae - Church Clothes 4 
 12. "Journey"

References

External links
Don Cannon at Discogs

Hip hop discographies
Production discographies
Discographies of American artists